The men's 110 kg weightlifting competitions at the 1988 Summer Olympics in Seoul took place on 27 September at the Olympic Weightlifting Gymnasium. It was the sixteenth appearance of the heavyweight II class.

Results

References

Weightlifting at the 1988 Summer Olympics